Guvva Gorinka is a 2020 Indian Telugu-language romantic drama film written and directed by Mohan Bammidi. The film stars Satyadev and Priyaa Lal, with Priyadarshi Pulikonda, Chaitanya Rao Madadi, Madhumita and Rahul Ramakrishna playing other roles. The film is produced by B. Jeevan Reddy and Damu Reddy Kosanam. The music is composed by Bobbili Suresh. The film premiered on 17 December 2020 on Amazon Prime Video. The Malayalam version is called Prema Kiligal, the Kannada version is called Gubbacchi Goravanka, the Tamil version is called kaadhal paravaigal.

Plot 
Sadanand (Satyadev) is a mechanical engineer who wants to invent a soundless vehicle. On the other hand, Siresha (Priyaa Lal) is a musician who comes to Hyderabad to do her Masters’s. They live in adjoining flats and somehow stumble upon each other by talking from their homes. They don’t see each other but keep talking for a long time. This casual conversation develops into friendship and eventually, they fall in love. What happens to them in the course of time forms the story of the film.

Cast 

 Satyadev as Sadanand aka Silencer
 Priyaa Lal as Sirisha aka Violin
 Chaitanya Rao Madadi as Arya, Harika’s boyfriend 
 Madhumitha Krishna as Harika, Sirisha’s friend
 Priyadarshi Pulikonda as Raghu Ram, Sadanand’s friend
 Rahul Ramakrishna
 Fish Venkat as Sadanand's father
 Prabhakar as Sirisha’s father
 Mangli as Prank reporter 
 Bitthiri Sathi

Production 
The film was initially launched in 2017, but due to various reasons the filming was delayed. Finally, the film was released on Amazon Prime in 2020.

Reception 
Thadhagath Pathi of The Times of India wrote that, "When you read the title Guvva Gorinka, you expect a cutesy love story that reflects the chemistry between two beautiful souls. But director Mohan Babu does anything but that. The concept of falling in love without meeting each other is not new to Tollywood but the writing of this film is what lets it down." Surya Prakash of Asianet News rated the film 1/5 and criticized it wafer-thin storyline. He compared the film's premise with the 2003 film Turn Left, Turn Right but added that script failed to raise beyond it."

IndiaGlitz reviewd and wrote, "'Guvva Gorinka' falls flat with a story that is shockingly childish. It's a run-of-the-mill, malnourished rom-com that hides its pointlessness behind lazy quirks and an Avunu Valliddaru Ista Paddaru!-type premise."

References

External links 

 

2020s Telugu-language films
2020 films
2020 romantic drama films
Indian romantic drama films
Amazon Prime Video original films